The following lists events that happened during 1996 in the Democratic Republic of São Tomé and Príncipe.

Incumbents
President: Miguel Trovoada
Prime Minister: Evaristo Carvalho

Events
30 June-21 July: First and second round of the presidential election took place
early-August: The Supreme Court declared that it was unable to adjudicate on the appeal made by Manuel Pinto da Costa, and recommended that the government seek international legal arbitration.
20 August: Manuel Pinto da Costa withdrew his challenge and Trovoada was confirmed as president.
31 December: the Higher Polytechnic Institute of São Tomé and Príncipe was established

Sports
Bairros Unidos FC won the São Tomé and Príncipe Football Championship

References

 
Years of the 20th century in São Tomé and Príncipe
1990s in São Tomé and Príncipe
São Tomé and Príncipe
São Tomé and Príncipe